Courbette may refer to:
 One of the Airs above the ground or school jumps performed by horses in classical dressage
 Courbette, a commune of the Jura département of France